Euclid Media Group (EMG) is a media company in the United States formed in 2013. Its headquarters are in Cleveland, Ohio and it owns the Orlando Weekly, Cincinnati CityBeat, Cleveland Scene, Creative Loafing (Tampa), Detroit Metro Times, Riverfront Times, San Antonio Current, Out In SA and Out in STL.

Times-Shamrock sold Cleveland Scene, Detroit Metro Times, Orlando Weekly and the San Antonio Current to EMG in December 2013. EMG merged Detroit Metro Times and alt-weekly Real Detroit in 2014. The company purchased Tampa Bay based publication Creative Loafing and the Cincinnati CityBeat in 2018.

References

External links

 

Mass media companies of the United States
Companies based in Cleveland